Dr. Ivan Lorković (17 June 1876  – 24 February 1926) was a Croatian politician from Zagreb. He was a prominent member of the Croat-Serb coalition, a supporter of the Republican organization and member of the United Croatian and Serbian academic youth organization. Between 1926 and 1929 he became the leader of the Croatian Federalist Peasant Party.

Career
Between 1902 and 1905 Ivan Lorković was the editor of the Osijek opposition newspaper, National Defense (Narodna Obrana). The paper helped to revive national awareness, pride and importance in Croatian politics. Using criticism and information he managed to help the middle class and youth of that region to begin to think politically. In 1905, he became one of the co-founders of the Croatian National Progressive Party.

In 1913, he won a seat during the Croatian parliamentary elections as a member of Croatian Republican Peasant Party representing the town of Valpovo. In 1914, Lorković visited Rome to attend a meeting that included politicians from all South Slavic lands within the Monarchy. He arrived with a controversial memorandum on how to break the Austro-Hungarian Empire and preserve the continuation of Croatian statehood. 

His proposal received opposition, most notably from Thomas G. Masaryk (founder and first president of the State of Czechoslovakia) who was skeptical about the plan since he did not believe that England and France would accept the idea of the total abrogation of the Empire, and was, therefore, was in favor of a confederation.

In 1918, due to disagreements over the Yugoslav issue, Lorković left the Croatia-Serb coalition and joined the newly founded community of Croatia (1919). Along with Stjepan Radic and others he entered the so-called "Hrvatski blok" or "Croatian Bloc" formed on 14 January 1922, when the Croatian Republican Peasant Party, the Croatian Community, and the Croatian Party of Rights went into an alliance. It existed until November of that year.

On 13 September 1925, at a conference of Croatian Community representatives and dissidents from the Croatian Peasant Party in Split, the Croatian People's Federalist Union was founded. On 11 January 1926, the Croatian Federalist Peasant Party was founded in Zagreb, and Lorković became the head of its Presidency. Following the 1928 assassination of Stjepan Radić, the party started to largely support the opposition Peasant-Democratic Coalition. As part of the 6 January Dictatorship, the party was formally banned on 20 January 1929.

His son was Ustaše minister Mladen Lorković.

Bibliography
 Banac, Ivo, The National Question in Yugoslavia: Origins, History, Politics, Ithaca: Cornell University Press (1984), p. 172

References

1876 births
1926 deaths
Yugoslav politicians
Representatives in the Croatian Parliament (1848–1918)
Croatian Peasant Party politicians
National Progressive Party (Carniola) politicians
Politicians from Zagreb
Yugoslavism
Austro-Hungarian journalists